The second French intervention in Mexico, also known as the Second Franco-Mexican War (1861–1867), was an invasion of the Second Federal Republic of Mexico, launched in late 1862 by the Second French Empire, at the invitation of Mexican conservatives. It helped replace the republic with a monarchy, known as the Second Mexican Empire, ruled by  Emperor Maximilian I of Mexico, member of the House of Habsburg-Lorraine which ruled colonial Mexico at its inception in the 16th century.

Mexican monarchists came up with the initial plan to return Mexico to a monarchical form of government, as it had been pre-independence and at its inception as an independent country., as the First Mexican Empire. They invited Napoleon III to aid in their cause and help create the monarchy, which would, in his estimations, lead to a country more favorable to French interests, but which was not always the case.

After the administration of Mexican President Benito Juárez placed a moratorium on foreign debt payments in 1861, France, the United Kingdom, and Spain agreed to the Convention of London, a joint effort to ensure that debt repayments from Mexico would be forthcoming. On 8 December 1861, the three navies disembarked their troops at the port city of Veracruz, on the Gulf of Mexico. However, when the British discovered that France had an ulterior motive and unilaterally planned to seize Mexico, the United Kingdom separately negotiated an agreement with Mexico to settle the debt issues and withdrew from the country; Spain subsequently left as well. The resulting French invasion established the Second Mexican Empire (1864–1867). Many European states acknowledged the political legitimacy of the newly created monarchy, while the United States refused to recognize it.

The intervention came as a civil war, the Reform War, had just concluded, and the intervention allowed the Conservative opposition against the liberal social and economic reforms of President Juárez to take up their cause once again. The Mexican Catholic Church, Mexican conservatives, much of the upper-class and Mexican nobility, and some Native Mexican communities invited, welcomed and collaborated with the French empire's help to install Maximilian of Habsburg as Emperor of Mexico. The emperor himself, however proved to be of liberal inclination and continued some of the Juárez government's most notable liberal measures. Some liberal generals defected to the Empire, including the powerful, northern governor Santiago Vidaurri, who had fought on the side of Juárez during the Reform War.

The French and Mexican Imperial Army rapidly captured much of Mexican territory, including major cities, but guerrilla warfare remained rampant, and the intervention was increasingly using up troops and money at a time when the recent Prussian victory over Austria was inclining France to give greater military priority to European affairs. The liberals also never lost the official recognition of the Union part of the United States, and the reunited country began providing materiel support following the end of the American Civil War in 1865. Invoking the Monroe Doctrine, the U.S. government asserted that it would not tolerate a lasting French presence on the continent. Facing defeats and mounting pressure both at home and abroad, the French finally began to leave in 1866. The Empire would only last a few more months; forces loyal to Juárez captured Maximilian and executed him in June 1867, restoring the Republic.

Background 

The French intervention in Mexico, initially supported by the United Kingdom and Spain, was a consequence of Mexican President Benito Juárez's imposition of a two-year moratorium of loan-interest payments from July 1861 to French, British, and Spanish creditors.

Through the influence of his wife, Eugénie de Montijo, Napoleon III of France had come into contact with Mexican monarchist exiles, José María Gutiérrez de Estrada and José Manuel Hidalgo who exposed Napoleon to the decades long effort to import a European prince to ascend a Mexican throne. He was initially not interested in the project due to the inevitable opposition that the effort would invite from the United States due to the Monroe Doctrine, a concern that would be rendered null with the outbreak of the American Civil War in 1861. Juarez's debt moratorium finally provided a pretext for intervention. Napoleon III would also claim that the military adventure was a foreign policy commitment to free trade and that the establishment of a European-derived monarchy in Mexico would ensure European access to Mexican resources, particularly French access to Mexican silver. However, Emperor Maximilian disagreed with the French emperor on Mexican resources going to anyone but Mexicans. More importantly, Napoleon III wanted to establish Mexico as a monarchist ally in the Americas in order to restrain the growing power of the United States. To realize his ambitions without interference from other European states, Napoleon III entered into a coalition with the United Kingdom and Spain.

History

Tripartite Expedition
On 14 December 1861, a Spanish fleet sailed into and took possession of the port of Veracruz. The city was occupied on the 17. French and British forces arrived on 7 January 1862. On 10 January a manifesto was issued by Spanish General Juan Prim disavowing rumors that the allies had come to conquer or to impose a new government. It was emphasized that the three powers merely wanted to open negotiations regarding their claims of damages.

On 14 January 1862, a bill of claims was presented to the government in Mexico City. Foreign Minister Manuel Doblado invited the commissioners to travel to Orizaba with two thousand of their own troops for a conference while requesting that the rest of the tripartite forces disembark from Veracruz. The proposal to disembark most of the troops was rejected, but negotiations then resulted in an agreement, ratified on 23 January, to move the forces inland and hold a conference at Orizaba. The agreement also officially recognized the government of Juarez along with Mexican sovereignty.

French invasion begins

On 9 April 1862, agreements at Orizaba between the allies broke down, as France made it increasingly clear that it intended to invade Mexico and interfere in its government in violation of previous treaties. The British informed the Mexican government that they now intended to exit the country, and an arrangement was made with the British government to settle its claims. Minister Doblado on 11 April made it known to the French government that its intentions would lead to war.

Certain Mexican officers had been sympathetic to the French since the beginning of the intervention. On 16 April 1862, the French issued a proclamation inviting Mexicans to join them in establishing a new government. On 17 April 1862, Mexican general Juan Almonte, who had been a foreign minister of the conservative government during the Reform War, and who was brought back to Mexico by the French, released his own manifesto, assuring the Mexican people of benevolent French intentions.

The French defeated a small Mexican force at Escamela, and then captured Orizaba. Mexican Generals Porfirio Diaz and Ignacio Zaragoza retreated to El Ingenio, and then headed towards Puebla.

Almonte now attempted to consolidate the Mexican pro-French movement. The town of Orizaba joined him and so did the port of Veracruz and Isla del Carmen. Colonel Gonzales, Manuel Castellanos, Desiderio Samaniego, Padre Miranda, and Haro Tamariz, and General Taboada arrived in Orizaba to support Almonte. On 28 April 1862, French forces headed towards Puebla.

On 5 May, Mexican forces commanded by Ignacio Zaragoza and Porfirio Diaz repulsed the French at the Battle of Puebla while the latter were trying to ascend the hill towards the fortified positions of the city. The French retreated to Orizaba to await reinforcements.

Mexican Generals Florentino Lopez, Leonardo Marquez, and Juan Vicario sought to join the French, and Mexican republican forces suffered defeats at Barranca Seca and Cerro del Borrego in the vicinity of Orizaba.

Establishment of the Empire

French reinforcements arrive

In July, reinforcements consisting of 30,000 men were sent out from France under the command of General Forey who was also given a set of instructions by Napoleon III laying out France's occupation policy. The instructions directed Forey to work with Mexican supporters in the pursuit of both military and political goals. A new government was to be set up, friendly to French interests, and the geopolitical aim of preventing the United States from becoming too powerful in the Americas was also emphasized. Forey reached Orizaba on 24 October 1862, and began planning another siege of Puebla, the defense of which had now passed on to Jesús González Ortega after General Zaragoza had died of Typhoid fever on 8 September.

On 10 January 1863, a French squadron bombarded the Mexican Pacific port of Acapulco and on 3 February, Forey finally set out for Puebla. Ortega had meanwhile been building up the town's fortifications, and on 10 March he put the town under martial law. The French arrived on the 16 March and began the siege.

On 8 May, at Battle of San Lorenzo, Bazaine and Marquez defeated Ignacio Comonfort who intended to provide reinforcements to Puebla. Having run out of ammunition and food, Ortega held a council of war, and it was agreed to surrender on 17 May, after destroying the remaining armament. All of the officers were taken  prisoner and were intended to be transported to France though Ortega and Porfirio Diaz would escape before being sent out of the country.

Fall of Mexico City
Upon hearing of the fall of Puebla, President Juarez prepared to evacuate the capital and move the government to San Luis Potosi. Congress closed its session on 31 May after granting Juarez emergency powers. The French entered the capital on 10 June.

On 16 June the French government nominated 35 Mexican citizens to constitute a Junta Superior de Gobierno who were then tasked with electing a triumvirate that was to serve as the executive of the new government. The three elected were Juan Almonte, Archbishop Labastida, and Jose Mariano Salas. The Junta was also to choose 215 Mexican citizens who together with the Junta Superior were to constitute an Assembly of Notables that was to decide upon the form of government. On 11 July, the Assembly  published its resolutions, that Mexico was to be a constitutional monarchy and that Ferdinand Maximilian was to be invited to accept the Mexican throne. The executive was then officially changed into the Regency of the Mexican Empire.

Republican guerilla forces maintained a presence surrounding the capital and were repeatedly defeated. Cuernavaca was captured by the imperialists on 29 July 1863. Republican guerilla commanders Catarino Fragoso, León Ugalde, and others continued to wage warfare against any town occupied by the French.

Imperialist successes in the central provinces
Franco-Mexican forces captured Pachuca and Tulancingo in July to serve as bases for expanding operations. Imperialist Juan Chávez under the command of General Mejia defeated the liberal Tomas O'Horan on the road to Guanajuato. O'Horan would then switch sides and join the imperialists. The imperialist colonel José Antonio Rodríguez then captured San Juan de los Llanos in Puebla. The port of Tampico was captured by French vessels on 11 August. French control of the country still centered on Veracruz and Mexico City but was gradually expanding. By October, advanced forces were spreading across the central regions of Mexico from Jalisco to San Luis Potosi to Oaxaca.

In August, the imperialist General Tomas Mejia captured the town of Actopan, Hidalgo in the state of Mexico in September, and more imperialist victories in that state followed. The imperialist Gavito, managed to disperse republican guerillas in Cuayuca, and the imperialist Jesús María Visoso managed to defeat Republican guerillas at Puebla.

Franco-Mexican forces under Leonardo Marquez and de Berthier entered Morelia unopposed on 30 November, after Republican forces had evacuated the city. After reinforcements arrived the Republican forces led by José López Uraga attempted to recapture Morelia, only to be defeated by Marquez.

General Tomas Mejia captured Querétaro on 17 November, while Republican forces there retreated to Guanajuato. Imperialist forces pursued them and the latter city was taken on 9 December.

On 22 December, the Republican government evacuated the city of San Luis Potosí and intended to relocate north to the state of Coahuila. Imperialist forces led by General Mejia captured the city on 25 December, only to face an assault by Republican forces on the 27 which was ultimately defeated.

Imperialist advances

French general Bazaine occupied the city of Guadalajara on 5 January 1864. The liberal generals Uraga and Ortega remained in the vicinity but carried out no attacks. After French assaults led by General Abel Douay, Ortega retreated towards Fresnillo, and Uraga westward.

Mexican General Felipe Navarrete of Yucatán proclaimed his support of the Empire, and invaded the state capital of Mérida with the support of French forces, capturing it on 22 January.

Douay, with General Castagny headed north, succeeding in capturing Aguascalientes and Zacatecas by 7 February 1864. Castagny was left in charge of Zacatecas, while Douay went to the relief of Colonel Garnier at Guadalajara. On 16 February, Castagny won a victory at Colotlán in which he took eighty prisoners and Republican General Luis Ghilardi was executed. Republican General and governor of Aguascalientes José Chávez was also executed after being captured in Jerez.

Imperialists struggled to hold on to the southern state of Chiapas. The nearby state capital of Tabasco, San Juan Bautista was recaptured by the Republicans on 27 February. The success inspired a republican incursion into Veracruz, succeeding in capturing Minatitlán on 28 March.

On 19 March, the western Mexican commander Manuel Lozada, at the head of the Indian troops of the Tepic district sided with the imperialists.

Douay headed south, pursuing the Republican guerilla chiefs Simón Gutiérrez and Antonio Rojas, routing the former, and destroying two factories for arms and powder near Cocula. In March Douay entered Colima.

Republican General Ortega and several guerilla bands were driven back into the Sierra Hermosa after Manuel Doblado was repulsed by Tomás Mejí in the former's attempted assault on Monterrey. Doblado fled the country for the United States and died a year later. Mejia was subsequently granted the cross of the Legion of Honour by Napoleon III.

The Emperor and Empress of Mexico arrived in Veracruz in the summer of 1864 and were later crowned in the Cathedral of Mexico City.

The Republican General Porfirio Diaz, with three thousand troops managed to defeat the imperialists commander Marcos Toledo at the silver mining town of Taxco on 26 October 1864. Diaz then besieged the brigade of Juan Vicario in the town of Iguala until imperialist reinforcements forced him to abandon the siege. Diaz headed south to Oaxaca and managed to increase his troops to eight thousand.

The Imperialists now controlled the central Mexican states, containing its major cities, two thirds of the population, rich mines and agricultural lands, and the main centers of manufacturing and trade. The Republicans still controlled the sparsely populated frontier states of the north, where President Juarez still led his government-in-exile in the city of Monterrey. These northern states granted them the considerable revenue coming into the Pacific ports of Manzanillo, Mazatlan, and Guaymas. Arms also flowed in from the U.S. states California and Texas along with mercenaries.

The republicans also still held southern states of Guerrero, Oaxaca, Tabasco, and Chiapas where troops led by Porfirio Diaz maintained a formidable hold.

Northern Campaign

The Imperialists now focused on capturing the rest of the north, with troops under General Mejia campaigning along the northern Gulf Coast, and being supported by Charles Dupin's anti-guerilla corps at Tampico, and Aymard's brigade at San Luis Potosi. Castagny supported the rear, and the entire operation was headquartered at Querétaro.

In the Pacific Coast, a naval squadron under de Kergrist was ready to cooperate with Douay's troops in Jalisco and sweep north towards Sinaloa. They were aided by quarrels within the Republican military leadership that resulted in José López Uraga being demoted and subsequently joining the Imperialists. On 26 September, the Imperialists captured the port of Bagdad and now controlled every major port in the Gulf. The commander of troops at Bagdad, Juan Cortina then defected to the Imperialists.

Santiago Vidaurri, the governor of Nuevo León and Coahuila had broken with Juarez, as early as March, 1864 over the administration and finances of his state, and had even held a referendum on joining the Empire. Republican troops drove him into Texas, but troops loyal to Viduarri remained active in the region. As Republican forces in the north were diverted by Imperial advances. Vidaurrist troops captured Monterrey on 15 August 1864, with President Juarez barely escaping, and pursued as far as Parras in a bullet-riddled carriage. The triumphant Vidaurri then headed towards the capital where he was made a councilor of Maximilian. By the end of the year the imperialists controlled Nuevo Leon and the greater part of Coahuila to the banks of the Rio Grande.

Southern Pacific Campaign

On 28 October 1864, imperialist Generals Leonardo Marquez and Douay attacked the army of Republican General Arteaga in the ravine of Atenquique, routing them. A few days later, the Republicans, Simón Gutiérrez and Antonio Rojas were defeated near the American border by the Imperialist Carlos Rivas, with French reinforcements. Marquez proceeded to occupy Colima and by 18 November 1864, Marquez had captured the port of Manzanillo.

On 12 November 1864, a French squadron under De Kergrist, arrived at Mazatlan, and demanded a surrender under the threat of bombardment. At the same time, the imperialist Manuel Lozada besieged the town on land leading to a successful capture.

The imperialist Juan Vicario was repulsed at Chilapa de Álvarez, while on the way to replace the French garrison in the southern, Pacific port of Acapulco, and subsequently the port had to be evacuated and left to the Republicans in December. French vessels succeeded in recapturing Acapulco on 11 September 1864.

The Imperialists however hoped to soon begin operations to dislodge Porfirio Diaz from his stronghold in the south, and began to survey the land and build roads. Towards the end of 1864, General Courtois d'Hurbal entered Oaxaca by way of Yanuitlan and other columns followed from Orizaba and Mexico City. Diaz was based in Oaxaca City with three thousand regulars, three thousand troops in the mountains, and had converted the city into a fortified camp.

Commander in Chief of the French Forces, Bazaine decided to lead the siege of Oaxaca City in person and by the end of January 1865, the besieging forces numbered seven thousand men. The use of artillery began on 4 February, and an assault was ordered for the 9th. The amassing of forces inspired a panic in Diaz' men and not willing to engage in a hopeless last stand, he surrendered, and was later sent to Puebla to be imprisoned, where he would escape seven months later and raise armies in the southern state of Guerrero. Back in France, Forey, the former commander in chief of French forces in Mexico criticized Bazaine for not immediately executing Diaz. The former Republican General José López Uraga sent a letter to Diaz hoping to win him over to the imperialist cause, arguing that guerrilla warfare was devastating the country and assuring Diaz that the independence of Mexico was secure under Maximilian. Diaz rejected this offer.

The French colonel Mangin remained at Oaxaca and rearranged the civilian government. Imperialist forces would continue to face sporadic conflict with Republican forces led by General Luis Pérez Figueroa.

Michoacan continued to be a Republican stronghold, serving as a base of operations for Nicolás Régules, :es:Manuel García Pueblita, Carlos Salazar Ruiz, and Vicente Riva Palacio, with the latter being named governor by Arteaga who held supreme command of the regional forces. On 31 January, the republican commander Nicolás Romero was defeated at Apatzingán by Colonel Poiter with a loss of 200 men. On 19 May, Salazar with four hundred men defeated a Franco-Mexican force of seven hundred at Los Reyes. Arteaga occupied Tacámbaro, and León Ugalde and Fermín Valdés captured Zitácuaro. Regulas ventured out into Guanajuato where he was checked and instead hastened back to Michoacan where he captured Tacambaro on 11 April, where the imperialists lost a significant number of Belgian mercenaries. The town however was soon taken back. Regules once again ventured out, this time towards Morelia but was checked at Huaniqueo by Potier.

In Jalisco, Douay's operations resulted in Republican guerilla commander Antonio Rojas being killed on 28 January 1865 at Potrerillos. Franco-Mexican operations led by Douay and Manuel Lozada resulted in the defection of the commander of the Republican Central Forces Miguel María de Echegaray, along with General Rómulo Valle

In January 1865, Castagny was sent with three thousand men to Mazatlán to follow up on the Imperialist victory there from the previous November. Fierce warfare ensued with the Republican General Ramón Corona and Lozada was sent to aid Castagny resulting in an Imperialist victory at El Rosario in April, 1865. Corona fled to the north but returned in September to win a victory for the Republicans, at Mazatlán

Sonoran Campaign
The success at Mazatlan now allowed the imperialists to turn their attention towards the northwest coast, and Castagny hoped to capture the port of Guaymas. A French squadron landed several hundred men under Colonel Garnier on 29 March. Garnier sent troops by sea to Álamos and managed to gain support among the Yaqui, Mayo, and Opata. Chief Refugio Tánori arrived at Guaymas with reinforcements allowing the imperialists to win the Battle of Álamos on 24 September, and then march into Hermosillo.

Decline of the Empire
The end of the American Civil War in April, 1865 marked a turning point in the French intervention. Republican commanders were hopeful that surplus arms and Union troops would soon aid them. Maximilian received a message from the liberal government, hopeful that the U.S. would now aid the Republicans, and advising him that he should leave the country while he still could. President Juarez was now confident of his ultimate victory, writing that "the United States will never permit [Maximilian] to consolidate his power, and his sacrifices and victories will have counted for nothing."

Struggle for the North
Republicans organized forces in the north with General Miguel Negrete gathering two thousand troops and in early April, capturing Saltillo, and Monterrey, which had been abandoned by the imperialists. Negrete advanced towards Matamoros and was joined by American volunteers, and general Juan Cortina who had previously defected to the Imperialists, yet now defected back to the Republicans. They succeeded in capturing all of the towns along the Rio Grande from Piedras Negras downstream. They got as far as Matamoros upon which they retreated after being faced with General Tomás Mejia and his French reinforcements.

Republican Colonel Pedro José Méndez captured Ciudad Victoria on April 23d, the culmination of a campaign that had begun in January. He subsequently captured Ciudad Tula on 4 June, and cut off communications from the imperialist held Tampico

Bazaine dispatched generals Auguste Henri Brincourt and Baron Neigre towards the Mapimi border in order to go after Negrete. Meanwhile, Colonel Pierre Joseph Jeanningros headed up from San Luis Potosi in order to rendezvous with imperialist forces at Saltillo. Negrete engaged with Jeanningros in a skirmish on 31 May, and retreated. His forces were disbanded in the course of being pursued by the imperialists.

A concentration of American troops and vessels in Texas along the Rio Bravo, led to a surge of imperialist troops along the frontier which only caused guerrilla warfare to flare up in the southern states. A few imperial prefects resigned, unable to govern or defend their respective departments without enough troops.

In August, 1865 as French troops were concentrated in the north under Bazaine. Sinaloa was left under the care of one regiment under Colonel Cotteret based in Guaymas, while the surrounding areas were entrusted to Indian allies. Republican General Antonio Rosales was killed in August in an attempt to retake Álamos. but General Corona nonetheless pressed upon the imperialists and succeeded in driving French troops throughout Sinaloa back to Mazatlán

After the defeat of Negrete, Brincourt had then proceeded towards Chihuahua with two thousand five hundred men. He entered Chihuahua City, then serving as the provisional capital of the Mexican Republic, on 15 August, reorganized the administration, was able to drive President Juarez out, and also provided encouragement to the various Indian allies of the Empire in the region. Out of fear that a border skirmish would occur with American forces, Bazaine ordered Brincourt to return to Durango within three weeks of reaching Chihuahua. Brincourt believed that leaving a garrison of a thousand men in Chihuahua was enough to pacify the region, but Bazaine repeated his orders, and Brincourt left on 29 October.

On 1 October, the Republican government arranged a loan in New York for thirty million dollars. American volunteers were joining the Republicans, and Juarez now taking refuge at El Paso del Norte expressed confidence that American pressure could play a decisive role in influencing French withdrawal.

On 2 October 1865, the imperial government passed the so-called "Black Decree" which declared that anyone caught engaging in guerrilla warfare against the Empire would be  court-martialed and executed within twenty four hours. Less severe penalties were prescribed for aiding guerillas and exceptions were made for those who were forced into service or were involved circumstantially.

On 13 October, Imperialist Colonel Ramón Méndez won a victory over the Republicans at Amatlán, and captured the generals Arteaga and Salazar, the latter who ranked as the commander in chief of the republican army of the center. Méndez took advantage of the recently passed Black Decree to execute both of them.

Mariano Escobedo attempted to take Matamoros on 25 October. The imperialist commander Tomas Mejia hesitated to take the offensive due to the presence of nearby U.S. troops and their sympathy for the Republicans, until French reinforcements arrived and scattered Escobedo's forces on 8 November.

After having stayed El Paso del Norte, Juarez was subsequently able then to return to Chihuahua City on 20 November. Maximilian however had convinced Bazaine to retain Chihuahua and an expedition of five hundred troops then towards the city led by Jean-Baptiste Billot. Juarez was forced to evacuate yet again on 9 December, and fled to the American border.

Escobedo then fell back on Monterrey succeeding in capturing the city, but a remnant of imperial forces remained in the citadel and held out until General Pierre Joseph Jeanningros arrived with reinforcements on 25 November, after which the imperialists recaptured Monterrey.

General Tomas Mejia and French naval commander Georges Charles Cloué protested to the United States regarding the aid in material, supplies, hospital care and troops being lent to the Republicans but the commandant at Clarksville, at the mouth of the Rio Grande, replied that such troops could no longer be considered as belonging to the United States military. In January 1866, American troops raided Bagdad, a blatant violation of neutrality which resulted in the federal government removing the commandant and disciplining those involved in the raid. The sack of Bagdad would leave the French cautious, and prevent them from active campaigning near the border, instead focusing on consolidating their hold a few strong positions, maintaining communications with French held ports.

Napoleon officially announces the French withdrawal
At the opening of the French chambers in January 1866, Napoleon III announced that he would withdraw French troops from Mexico. In reply to a French request for neutrality, the American secretary of state William H. Seward replied that French withdrawal should be unconditional, and Napoleon assured the American government that the withdrawal would no longer be deferred, laying out a plan to reduce the troops in phases starting in November 1866 and ending one year later in November 1867. Seward then requested that French reinforcements to Mexico should now cease, and that Austria should stop recruiting volunteers for the Mexican expedition. The French and Austrian governments subsequently complied.

Further northern retreats
Billot retired on 31 January from Chihuahua, leaving the city in charge of Indian allies, but it fell to Republican troops in March. Maximilian commanded Bazaine to retake Chihuahua in May, and a new expedition was prepared, but new withdrawal instructions from France caused the expedition to be abandoned.

Durango was evacuated by November, and Castagny withdrew to Leon leading to a loss of the former province to the Republicans. Juarez moved his government south to Durango on 26 December 1866.

In the northwest provinces of Sonora and Sinaloa the French were mostly confined to Guaymas and Mazatlan, though the imperial General Edvard Emile Langberg held positions in the interior with the aid of the Opata natives. Álamos was captured by the Republican general Ángel Martínez with forces from Sinaloa, and dealt out retributions to the Mayo and Yaqui tribes that had allied themselves with the Empire. He then took back Hermosillo on 4 May only to lose it to the Imperialists the day after. The French withdrew from Guaymas in September, and around the same time Langberg was killed in a battle that led the Republicans to take the town of Ures.

Sonora now fell to the Republicans and hundreds of refugees fled to the United States or tried to retreat with the French. Imperialist commanders Refugio Tánori and Almada were overtaken and shot with their families by the Republicans.

Southern defeats

In July, 1865 Arteaga had advanced towards Tacámbaro with three thousand men where he was routed by Lieutenant Colonel Van der Smissen with less than one thousand troops.

In Michoacan Regules were repeatedly repulsed to the point that his forces dissolved in April, 1866. In May however, he resumed operations and made it into the Toluca region, finding allies around Zitacuaro and Guerrero. Acapulco was held on to by the imperialist General Montenegro, but his troops were greatly weakened by fever and desertion.

After Porfirio Diaz escaped he fled to Oaxaca and hoped to form a new army. The imperialist prefect Prieto had held on to Tehuantepec since mid-1865, and hoped to turn it into a base for operations. Diaz encroached upon this territory in the Spring of 1866, notably at Jamiltepec and Putla, upon which he sought to cut off communications between Oaxaca and Puebla. Diaz took Teotitlan in August, 1866, before he was repulsed by Austro-Mexican forces. In early October, Diaz routed the imperialist general Oronoz, who barely escaped and retreated into Oaxaca City, after which Diaz began a siege. The siege was lifted for a few days to face Austro-Mexican reinforcements, which Diaz defeated, and then captured Oaxaca City on 1 November 1866. From there he completed the capture of Oaxaca and advanced into Puebla.

Defeats in the northern Gulf Coast
In the northeast, Republican forces were led by Mendez who blocked the route to Tampico, Mariano Escobedo who was based north of Linares, and Gonzales Herrera and Trevino who were based around Parras. After a Republican assault on Parras, the imperialist commander Briant came up from Saltillo, reinstalled the imperialist prefect Campos, on 20 February. He then set out to attack the liberals at Santa Isabel where due to underestimating their forces was routed and captured. The Republicans did not immediately take Parrs, but the French withdrawal allowed them to take the town in June 1866.

At Charco Escondido, Mejia was struggling against Republicans whose forces were being swelled by American soldiers. He was given reinforcements by General Jeanningros in April. Another train of reinforcements led by General Olvera left Matamors where they were surrounded and defeated by Republican troops led by Mariano Escobedo near Camargo. Olvera nonetheless managed to retreat to and hold Matamoros, but the Imperialist General Tuce who had arrived with reinforcements from Monterey was obliged to retreat. Mejia was left with 500 men, and ultimately retreated on June 23d with all his men to Veracruz.

In November 1866, Matamoros fell to the Republicans with the aid of American troops. On 9 November, the imperialist Generals Marquez and Miramon returned from Europe to aid in the war effort. By the end of November, the French withdrawal had resulted in the Republicans taking back the North and West of the country.

On 13 November 1866, the French completed their evacuation of Mazatlan. After having aided the evacuation the former imperialist General Lozada retired from the conflict and proclaimed his neutrality.

The Republican commander Mendez who had raided communications between San Luis Potosi and the gulf was killed during an imperialist raid near Tampico. Nonetheless, due to the French withdrawal, the Republican General Aureliano Rivera captured Tampico in May. The French held on to the port but surrendered in July and in August they surrendered Tuxpan. Veracruz was now the only gulf port left under imperialist control.

Monterey was evacuated by the Imperialists on 25 July 1865, and Saltillo on 4 August.

Douay evacuated Matehuala on 28 October, then being the northernmost imperialist post. Troops were left in San Luis Potosi under Mejia, yet the small prospect of victory induced them to retreat on Christmas Eve to San Felipe in Guanajuato. Castagny reached Guanajuato around the same time, with French forces from Durango and Zacatecas the latter having been evacuated in November.

Central provinces become vulnerable
Veracruz and the roads leading to them had been harassed by Republicans ever since the beginning of 1866, and the beginning of the French withdrawal. There was an Imperialist victory at Papaloapan River, but by August, Tlacotalpan and Alvarado were surrendered to the Republicans. A republican revolt led by Ignacio Alatorre had been crushed in Papantla and Misantla, but with Republican successes further north, Alatorre rose up again, capturing Jalapa in November. Pachuca was captured by the republicans in November, and Perote fell in January, 1867.

The capital itself became vulnerable in late 1866. Cuautitlán was raided in October, and Chalco and Tlalpan were left exposed to Republican incursions in December, while raiders harassed the stream of soldiers and refugees heading towards Vera Cruz. The Imperialist commander Ortiz de la Peña had retreated to Cuernavaca after a defeat in Ixtla, and Regules and Riva Palacio moved ahead to occupy the Lerma Valley.

Guadalajara was abandoned by the French on 12 December 1866, and imperial forces were left under General Gutierrez. The imperialists evacuated the city on 19 December, and headed for Guanajuato. The former imperial commander Lozada meanwhile declared the neutrality of the department of Nayarit.

Final French evacuations
On 19 December 1866, Napoleon III made it known that all troops would now be withdrawn, ahead of the previously laid out schedule.

In late December, the French evacuated Guanjuato, rendezvousing in Querétaro with retreating troops from San Luis Potosi, and then heading towards the port of Vera Cruz. An imperialist garrison under Tomas Mejia however remained at Guanajuato, were able to hold a position and keep republican troops at bay.

Bazaine evacuated the capital on 5 February 1867. Vera Cruz was left in charge of the imperial general Perez Gomez. Vera Cruz was a hub of activity with more than thirty vessels, including transports, mail steamers, and squadron ships in the harbor to help the evacuation. Bazaine and the last of the French troops embarked for Toulon on 12 March.

Republican victory

With the end of the official French presence, the intervention was technically over, and yet the Empire which French troops and their Mexican collaborators had set up would last for a few months more, with the same Mexican generals that had previously fought alongside the French continuing the play a leading role, along with hundreds of Frenchmen that remained as independent mercenaries.

After a council at Orizaba which decided against his abdication, Maximilian intended to return to Mexico City, first remaining at Puebla for nearly three weeks, and making preparations for the campaign. The country was divided into three great military districts the western, comprising the provinces north of Colima, including Durango and Chihuahua; the eastern, stretching from Aguascalientes and Tampico northward; and the central, embracing all the vast remainder to Chiapas. Miramon, who took command of the western district, had already set out to create his army, with little regard for the means to be employed, but Mejia in the east stood at the head of nearly 4,000 men; and Marquez, controlling the center, had 4,000 under Ramón Méndez in Michoacan, and fully 2,000 troops stationed at Puebla, Maximilian assumed the supreme command, and issued orders for the active formation of the new national army as well as militia.

Unfortunately for the Empire, the Western and Eastern military district were in possession of the Republicans, as well as the region south of Puebla, while the few remaining central provinces were overrun by hostile bands and about to be invaded by the Republican armies. Funds and resources were also lacking. Meanwhile arms and funds from the United States were pouring into the hands of the Republicans.

On 27 January 1867, Miramon triumphantly captured Aguascalientes and nearly succeeded in capturing Juarez, the retreat of Governor Auza managing to save him. Miramon however, did not intend to advance any further, satisfied with seizing funds from the population and with the diversion he had created among the Republicans, he retired to join Castillo at San Luis Potosi. The Republican general Mariano Escobedo figured out his intentions and intercepted him at San Jacinto at 1 February, leading to a complete rout. Miramon escaped with Castillo and took refuge in Queretaro. The Republicans had by then captured Guanajuato, and then Morelia. The Imperialists retreated from Michoacan to the borders of San Luis Potosi and fell back upon Queretaro.

Siege of Queretaro

Maximilian joined the army at Queretaro along with Minister Aguirre, Leonardo Marquez, and Miguel López with the sum of fifty thousand pesos, with sixteen hundred men and twelve cannons. Maximilian reached Queretaro on 19 February, and was received by enthusiasm Miramon and the other generals who held a formal reception for the emperor.

A few days after his arrival a review of the troops was held, showing 9,000 men with 39 cannon, including about 600 Frenchmen, Miramon was placed at the head of the infantry, of which Castillo and Casanova received each a division, Mendez assuming command of the reserve brigade, in which Miguel Lopez served as colonel, Mejia became chief of the cavalry, Reyes of engineers, and Arellano of the artillery. To, Marquez, chief of the general staff, was accorded the foremost place, to the indignity of Miramon. Maximilian, Miramon, Marquez, Mejia, and Mendez became known as the five magic M's of the Empire.

In the first council of war that had been held on 22 February, it had been agreed to fight the Republicans at once, before their combined forces became too strong, but ultimately this strategy, which historian Bancroft suggests could have achieved victory, was rejected at the behest of Marquez. As the liberals began to surround Queretaro, Marquez then suggested to flee to Mexico City, still held by the Imperialists, gather their forces and face the liberal armies in one final decisive battle, but this was deemed as impractical.

On 5 March, the Republican forces came into view of the defenders at Queretaro, and began to prepare for a siege. After the fighting had begun Marquez once again brought up his plan of retreating to Mexico City, but Miramon and others strongly opposed it. Miramon planned to lead a counter attack to recover the hill of San Gregorio on 17 March. When the time arrived however, a false alarm arose that the Imperialist headquarters were under attack, leading to the assulat on San Gregorio to be put off.

Miramon now expressed his support for a plan to destroy the Western positions of the Republicans therefore providing a way to retreat if needed. Marquez was assigned to go to Mexico City to seek reinforcements. Miramon was assigned to provide a distraction and on 22 March he led an expedition down the valley, which captured a quantity of provisions. Marquez was able to depart during the night with 1200 horsemen and Miramon now became the leading general at Queretaro.

After the Imperialists repulsed another Republican assault, leaving the latter with 2000 deaths, Miramon, during an award ceremony, took one of the medals and asked to decorate the Emperor for his conduct during the battle, which Maximilian accepted, and would go on the wear as the most valued of his decorations.

On 1 April Miramon led a counter attack to the hill of San Gregorio, but lack of reinforcements left the attack without any decisive results.

As any news of Marquez failed to arrive, a mission was sent to Mexico City to see what happened. Miramon urged Maximilian to leave as well but, the latter chose to stay. The mission failed, and now leading officers outright urged surrender.

The Imperialists now planned to fight their way out of Queretaro, and as preparation Miramon planned an attack on the Cimatario Hill on 27 April, to which he advanced with 2000 men. The Imperialist repulsed the Republican forces, dispersing thousands and taking 500 prisoners, but the Imperialists squandered vital time planning their next move, and Republican reserves arrived to provide a defeat.

The Imperialists now sought to break through the enemy lines and seek refuge in the mountain range of the Sierra Gorda, and possibly reach the coast. The operation was scheduled to take place on 15 May.

Unfortunately for the Imperialists, before these plans were carried out they were betrayed by Colonel Miguel Lopez, and on the night of 14 May , he opened the gates of Queretaro to the Republican forces in exchange for a sum of gold. Republican troops quickly overwhelmed the city and Miramon, Mejia, and Maximilian were taken prisoner.

The end of the Empire and the execution of Maximilian

Following a court-martial, Maximilian was sentenced to death. Many of the crowned heads of Europe and other prominent figures (including liberals Victor Hugo and Giuseppe Garibaldi) sent telegrams and letters to Mexico pleading for Maximilian's life to be spared, but Juárez refused to commute the sentence. He believed he had to send a strong message that Mexico would not tolerate any government imposed by foreign powers.

Maximilian was executed on 19 June (along with his generals Miguel Miramón and Tomás Mejía) on the Cerro de las Campanas, a hill on the outskirts of Querétaro, by forces loyal to President Benito Juárez, who had kept the federal government functioning during the French intervention. Mexico City surrendered the day after Maximilian was executed.

The republic was restored, and President Juárez was returned to power in the national capital. He made few changes in policy, given that the progressive Maximilian had upheld most of Juárez's liberal reforms.

After the victory, the Conservative party was so thoroughly discredited by its alliance with the invading French troops that it effectively became defunct. The Liberal party was almost unchallenged as a political force during the first years of the "restored republic". In 1871, however, Juárez was re-elected to yet another term as president in spite of a constitutional prohibition of re-elections. The French intervention ended with the Republican-led government being more stable and both internal and external forces were now kept at bay.

Porfirio Díaz (a Liberal general and a hero of the French war, but increasingly conservative in outlook), one of the losing candidates, launched a rebellion against the president. Supported by conservative factions within the Liberal party, the attempted revolt (the so-called Plan de la Noria) was already at the point of defeat when Juárez died in office on 19 July 1872, making it a moot point. Díaz ran against interim president Sebastián Lerdo de Tejada, lost the election, and retired to his hacienda in Oaxaca. Four years later, in 1876, when Lerdo ran for re-election, Díaz launched a second, successful revolt (the Plan de Tuxtepec) and captured the presidency. He held it through eight terms until 1911 now known as the Porfiriato. After many decades of civil wars, Mexico had finally exhausted itself and the general Porfirio Díaz had forced peace through his regime with no big rebellions or coups occurring.

France's adventure in Mexico had improved relations with Austria through Maximilian but produced no result as France had politically alienated itself in the international community. During 1866, Prussia went to war with France's indirect ally Austria, which was promptly defeated while French troops were still in Mexico unable to affect the situation in Europe. As for Napoleon's empire, it would later collapse in 1870 during the Franco-Prussian war.

U.S. diplomacy and involvement
As early as 1859, U.S. and Mexican efforts to ratify the McLane-Ocampo Treaty had failed in the bitterly divided U.S. Senate, where tensions were high between the North and the South over slavery issues. Such a treaty would have allowed U.S. construction in Mexico and protection from European forces in exchange for a payment of $4 million to the heavily indebted government of Benito Juárez. On 3 December 1860, President James Buchanan had delivered a speech stating his displeasure at being unable to secure Mexico from European interference:

European governments would have been deprived of all pretext to interfere in the territorial and domestic concerns of Mexico. We should have thus been relieved from the obligation of resisting, even by force, should this become necessary, any attempt of these governments to deprive our neighboring Republic of portions of her territory, a duty from which we could not shrink without abandoning the traditional and established policy of the American people.

United States policy did not change during the French occupation as it had to use its resources for the American Civil War, which lasted 1861 to 1865. President Abraham Lincoln expressed his sympathy to Latin American republics against any European attempt to establish a monarchy. Shortly after the establishment of the imperial government in April 1864, United States Secretary of State William H. Seward, while maintaining U.S. neutrality, expressed U.S. discomfort at the imposition of a monarchy in Mexico: "Nor can the United States deny that their own safety and destiny to which they aspire are intimately dependent on the continuance of free republican institutions throughout America."

On 4 April 1864, Congress passed a joint resolution:

Resolved, &c., That the Congress of the United States are unwilling, by silence, to leave the nations of the world under the impression that they are indifferent spectators of the deplorable events now transpiring in the Republic of Mexico; and they therefore think fit to declare that it does not accord with the policy of the United States to acknowledge a monarchical government, erected on the ruins of any republican government in America, under the auspices of any European power.

Near the end of the American Civil War, representatives at the 1865 Hampton Roads Conference briefly discussed a proposal for a north–south reconciliation by a joint action against the French in Mexico. In 1865, through the selling of Mexican bonds by Mexican agents in the United States, the Juárez administration raised between $16-million and $18-million dollars for the purchase of American war material. Between 1865 and 1868, General Herman Sturm acted as an agent to deliver guns and ammunition to the Mexican Republic led by Juárez. In 1866 General Philip Sheridan was in charge of transferring additional supplies and weapons to the Liberal army, including some 30,000 rifles directly from the Baton Rouge Arsenal in Louisiana.

By 1867, Seward shifted American policy from thinly veiled sympathy for the republican government of Juárez to open threat of war to induce a French withdrawal. Seward had invoked the Monroe Doctrine and later stated in 1868, "The Monroe Doctrine, which eight years ago was merely a theory, is now an irreversible fact."

Divisions and disembarkation of allied troops

French expeditionary force, 31 December 1862

At its peak in 1863, the French expeditionary force counted 38,493 men  (which represented 16.25% of the French army). 6,654  French died, including 4,830 from disease. Among these losses, 1,918 of the deaths were from the regiment of the French Foreign Legion.

Général de Division Forey

1ère Division d'Infanterie (GdD Bazaine) 
1ère Brigade (GdB de Castagny)
18e Bataillon de Chasseurs
1er Régiment de Zouaves
81e Régiment de Ligne
2e Brigade (GdB ?)
20e Bataillon de Chasseurs
3ème Régiment de Zouaves
95e Régiment d'Infanterie légère
 Bataillon de Tirailleurs algériens
2x Marine artillery batteries

2e Division d'Infanterie (GdB Douay – acting) 
1ère Brigade (Col Hellier – acting)
1er Bataillon de Chasseurs
2e Régiment de Zouaves
99e Régiment d'Infanterie légère
2e Brigade (GdB Berthier)
7e Bataillon de Chasseurs
51e Régiment de Ligne
62e Régiment de Ligne
2x Army artillery batteries

Brigade de Cavallerie (GdB de Mirandol) 
1er Régiment de Marche (2 squadrons each of 1er and 2e Chasseurs d'Afrique)
2e Régiment de Marche (2 squadrons each of 3e Chasseurs d'Afrique and 12e Chasseurs à cheval)

Naval Brigade 
Bataillon de Fusiliers-Marins
2e Régiment d'Infanterie de Marine

Units not yet arrived:
7e Régiment de Ligne (2000 men)
1e Régiment Étranger (4000 men)
2e Bataillon d'Infanterie legère d'Afrique (900 men)
Bataillon Egyptien
detachment/ 5e Régiment de Hussards

Belgian Voluntary Troops 1864–65

This corps was officially designated as the "Belgian Volunteers", but generally known as the "Belgian Legion".

Bataillon de l'Impératrice Charlotte (grenadiers)
Bataillon Roi des Belges (voltigeurs)

16 October 1864 
1st Grenadier Company
4 Officers, 16 Non-commissioned officers, 125 grenadiers, 6 musicians, 1 canteener
2nd Grenadier Company "Bataillon de l'Impératrice"
4 Officers, 16 Non-commissioned officers, 122 grenadiers, 4 musicians, 1 canteener
1st voltigeur Company
4 Officers, 16 Non-commissioned officers, 122 voltigeurs, 4 musicians, 1 canteener
2nd voltigeur Company
4 Officers, 16 Non-commissioned officers, 121 voltigeurs, 4 musicians, 1 canteener

14 November 1864 
3rd Grenadier Company
4 Officers, 16 Non-commissioned officers, 68 grenadiers, 6 musicians, 1 canteener
4th Grenadier Company
4 Officers, 15 Non-commissioned officers, 67 grenadiers, 6 musicians, 1 canteener
3rd voltigeur Company
3 Officers, 16 Non-commissioned officers, 61 voltigeurs, 3 musicians, 1 canteener
4th voltigeur Company
3 Officers, 15 Non-commissioned officers, 69 voltigeurs, 4 musicians, 1 canteener

16 December 1864 
5th Grenadier Company
6th Grenadier Company
5th voltigeur Company
6th voltigeur Company
362 volunteers

27 January 1865 
189 volunteers

15 April 1866 
1st Mounted Company
70–80 horsemen (formed from Regiment "Impératrice Charlotte")

16 July 1866 
2nd Mounted Company
70–80 horsemen (formed from Regiment "Roi des Belges")

Austrian Voluntary Corps December 1864

While officially designated as the Austrian Voluntary Corps, this foreign contingent included Hungarian, Polish and other volunteers from the Danube Monarchy. It consisted of:

159 officers
403 infantry and jägers (Austrian)
366 hussars (Hungarian)
16 uhlans (Polish)
67 bombardiers (mixed)
30 pioneers (mixed)
several doctors

Egyptian Auxiliary Corps January 1863
This unit was commonly designated as the "Egyptian Battalion". It consisted of 453 men (including troops recruited from the Sudan), who were placed under the command of French commandant Mangin of the 3rd Zouave Regiment. Operating effectively in the Veracruz region, the Corps suffered 126 casualties until being withdrawn to Egypt in May 1867.

Maximilian protested the loss of the Egyptian Corps, ostensibly to suppress a rebellion in the Sudan, because they were "extremely helpful in the hot lands".

 A battalion commander
 A captain
 A lieutenant
 8 sergeants
 15 corporals
 359 soldiers
 39 recruits

Spanish Expeditionary Force January 1862
Making up this contingent were:
 5373 infantry (two brigades)
 26 pieces of artillery,
 490 bombardiers
 208 engineers
 100 administrators
 173 cavalry

Captain Yarka, Romanian volunteer (1863)
At least one Romanian, an officer, served with the French forces. Captain Yarka of the Romanian Army served with the 3rd Regiment of Chasseurs d'Afrique as a volunteer, keeping the same rank. In April 1863, Yarka engaged a Republican ("Juariste") Colonel in one-on-one combat, killing him. Yarka himself was wounded. In contemporary French sources, he is referred to as Wallachian ("Valaque").

See also
History of democracy in Mexico
List of battles of the French intervention in Mexico

References

Further reading

 Bancroft, Hubert Howe. History of Mexico: Being a Popular History of the Mexican People from the Earliest Primitive Civilization to the Present Time The Bancroft Company, New York, 1914, pp. 466–506
 Brittsan, Zachary. Popular Politics and Rebellion in Mexico: Manuel Lozada and La Reforma, 1855-1876. Nashville: Vanderbilt University Press 2015.
 Corti, Egon Caesar. Maximilian and Charlotte of Mexico (2 vols. 1968). 976 pages
 Cunningham, Michele. Mexico and the Foreign Policy of Napoleon III, Palgrave Macmillan, 2001
 Garay,  Lerma. Antonio. Mazatlán Decimonónico, Autoedición. 2005. .
 Shawcross, Edward. The Last Emperor of Mexico: A Disaster in the New World. London: Faber & Faber, 2022; The Last Emperor of Mexico: The Dramatic Story of the Habsburg Archduke Who Created a Kingdom in the New World. New York: Basic Books, 2021.
 Sheridan, Philip H. Personal Memoirs of P.H. Sheridan, Charles L. Webster & Co., 1888,  (vol. 2, part 5, Chapter IX)
 Topik, Steven C.  "When Mexico Had the Blues: A Transatlantic Tale of Bonds, Bankers, and Nationalists, 1862–1910," American Historical Review, June 2000, Vol. 105, Issue 3, pp. 714–40

External links
Chronology of the Mexican Adventure 1861–1867 
Bibliography for the French intervention in Mexico 

 
1860s in Mexico
19th-century colonization of the Americas
19th century in Mexico
19th-century guerrilla wars
1861 in the French colonial empire
1862 in the French colonial empire
1863 in the French colonial empire
1864 in the French colonial empire
1865 in the French colonial empire
1866 in the French colonial empire
1867 in the French colonial empire
1861 in Mexico
1862 in Mexico
1863 in Mexico
1864 in Mexico
1865 in Mexico
1866 in Mexico
1867 in Mexico
Conflicts in 1861
Conflicts in 1862
Conflicts in 1863
Conflicts in 1864
Conflicts in 1865
Conflicts in 1866
Conflicts in 1867
Expeditions from France
French colonization of the Americas
Foreign intervention
Foreign relations during the American Civil War
History of Mexico
Independent Mexico
Invasions by France
Invasions of Mexico
Maximilian I of Mexico
Napoleon III
Proxy wars

Second French Empire
Wars involving Austria
Wars involving Belgium
Wars involving France
Wars involving Mexico
Wars involving Spain
Wars involving the United Kingdom
Wars involving the United States
France–Mexico relations